Mesomphalia  is a genus of leaf beetles belonging to the family Chrysomelidae.

Species
 Mesomphalia albofasciculata Boheman, 1856  
 Mesomphalia ampliata Boheman, 1850  
 Mesomphalia denudata Boheman, 1850  
 Mesomphalia gibbosa (Fabricius, 1781)  
 Mesomphalia latipennis Boheman, 1856  
 Mesomphalia nudoplagiata Spaeth, 1901  
 Mesomphalia pyramidata Boheman, 1850  
 Mesomphalia retipennis Boheman, 1850  
 Mesomphalia scrobiculata Boheman, 1850  
 Mesomphalia sexmaculata Boheman, 1850  
 Mesomphalia sexmaculosa Boheman, 1856  
 Mesomphalia sublaevis Boheman, 1850  
 Mesomphalia subnitens Spaeth, 1917  
 Mesomphalia tumidula Boheman, 1850  
 Mesomphalia turrita (Illiger, 1801)  
 Mesomphalia variolaris Boheman, 1850

References
 Encyclopaedia of Life
 Biolib

Cassidinae